The Pullur Kodavalam inscription (dated to 1020 AD) is an early 11th century stone inscription from Pullur, near Kanhangad in Kerala, south India. The old Malayalam inscription in Vattezhuthu script (with some Grantha characters) is engraved on a single stone slab in the courtyard of the Pullur Kodavalam Vishnu Temple.

The inscription relates to the rule of Chera Perumal king Bhaskara Ravi "Manukuladitya" in Kasaragodu. It is the northernmost available epigraphical record mentioning a Chera Perumal king. The analysis of the inscription also identified king "Manukuladitya" with king Bhaskara Ravi.

 The record falls under the A-series inscriptions of king Bhaskara Ravi (dated to 58th A-series regnal year).
 The record says that the uralar (proprietors) of Kudavalam village installed the inscribed stone showing three kalanju (weight used as a standard) of gold as the amount of annual dues (attaikkol) fixed by royal order to be paid to the king (from that village).

References 

Kerala history inscriptions